Jean-Jacques Daigneault (born October 12, 1965) is a Canadian former professional ice hockey defenceman who played in the National Hockey League from 1984 to 2000. He was the head coach of the Halifax Mooseheads of the Quebec Major Junior Hockey League from 2019 to 2021. He also served as an assistant coach for the Montreal Canadiens of the NHL from 2012 until the end of the 2017–18 NHL season.

Playing career
As a youth, Daigneault and his teammate Mario Lemieux, played in the 1977 and 1978 Quebec International Pee-Wee Hockey Tournaments with a minor ice hockey team from Ville-Émard.

Daigneault was selected tenth overall in the first round of the 1984 NHL Entry Draft by the Vancouver Canucks. Daigneault is one of the most well-travelled players in NHL history. When he joined his tenth team, the Minnesota Wild, in 2000, he tied the NHL record held by Michel Petit. The record has since been broken by Mike Sillinger. Daigneault remains tied for second in the category, along with Petit, Jim Dowd, Lee Stempniak, Derick Brassard, Mathieu Schneider, Dominic Moore and Olli Jokinen.

Daigneault played for the Vancouver Canucks (1984–85 – 1985–86), Philadelphia Flyers (1986–87 – 1987–88), Montreal Canadiens (1989–90 – 1995–96), St. Louis Blues (1995–96), Pittsburgh Penguins (1995–96 – 1996–97), Mighty Ducks of Anaheim (1996–97 – 1997–98), New York Islanders (1997–98), Nashville Predators (1998–99), Phoenix Coyotes (1998–99 – 1999–2000), and Minnesota Wild (2000–01). He played in the Stanley Cup finals with Philadelphia in 1987, and was a key member of the Montreal Canadiens as they won their 24th Stanley Cup in 1993.

1987 Stanley Cup Finals
Daigneault's earliest fame at the NHL level came when he scored the winning goal for the Philadelphia Flyers in the sixth game of the 1987 Stanley Cup Finals against the Edmonton Oilers. Daigneault had scored only six goals during the regular season, and, up to that point, had zero points in 8 playoff games. In 2006 this game was voted the eighth-greatest game in Philadelphia Flyers history according to fan voting.

Career statistics

Regular season and playoffs

International

Coaching career

Personal life
Daigneault and his wife Janie have three daughters, Valerie, Gabrielle and Juliette. All three of the girls were born in different states where Daigneault was playing at the time. The family resides in Dorval, Quebec.

References

External links
 

1965 births
Living people
Canadian ice hockey defencemen
Cleveland Lumberjacks players
EHC Biel players
French Quebecers
Hershey Bears players
Ice hockey people from Montreal
Ice hockey players at the 1984 Winter Olympics
Laval Voisins players
Longueuil Chevaliers players
Mighty Ducks of Anaheim players
Minnesota Wild players
Montreal Canadiens players
Montreal Canadiens coaches
Nashville Predators players
National Hockey League first-round draft picks
New York Islanders players
Olympic ice hockey players of Canada
Philadelphia Flyers players
Phoenix Coyotes players
Pittsburgh Penguins players
St. Louis Blues players
Sherbrooke Canadiens players
Stanley Cup champions
Vancouver Canucks draft picks
Vancouver Canucks players
Worcester IceCats players
Canadian ice hockey coaches